The Superstation Orkney, also known as just The Superstation, was a community radio station, broadcasting to Orkney and Caithness. Until its closure in November 2014, the station was Orkney's only independent radio station, and broadcast 'a broad range of popular and contemporary
music'. The station also broadcast local news bulletins on the half-hour and national news from Sky News Radio on the hour.

The Superstation broadcast on 105.4 FM from the Wideford Hill transmitter near Kirkwall and online via the station's website.

The station also offered free courses in radio production and presentation.

History

Restricted Service Licence 
The Superstation began broadcasting under a three-month trial Restricted Service Licence awarded by Ofcom on Saturday 4 September 2004, from the MV Communicator, berthed at St Margaret's Hope. The station was expected to launch earlier in the week, but could not due to not being linked to the Wideford Hill radio transmitter which serves Orkney. The licence expired and the station ceased broadcasting at around 7pm on Tuesday 23 November 2004.

Community radio licence 
After The Superstation's RSL expired, the station applied to Ofcom for a community radio licence. Ofcom's Radio Licensing Committee granted Superstation Orkney the licence on 5 September 2005. The station resumed broadcasting under its community radio licence on Monday 14 January 2008 at 12:00 GMT with a show co-presented by Dave Miller & Ryan Woodman.

Closure 
At midday on Sunday 16 November 2014, The Superstation ceased broadcasting under its community radio licence, having announced its closure online with just two hours' notice. The station's founder, Dave Miller, said a lack of public funding and dwindling advertising revenue during its later years had forced the community interest company which owned The Superstation to cease trading.

Former Presenters Before Closure 

 Ryan Woodman
 JC
 Ron Brown
 Peter Quinn
 Gary King
 Andy Lawson
 Dave Sherwood
 Dave Miller
 Will Atkinson
 Sam Turner

Former Programming

Weekday Mornings
The Golden Hour
Hit's Not Homework
Through The Night
New Music Show
The Superstation Dance
Totally 90s
Europe Rocks

The Quiet Storm
Drivetime
The Superstation Party
Totally 80s
The Time Tunnel
Club Classics
Chillout Show
Solid Gold Sunday

References

External links 
 The Superstation Orkney

Radio stations in Scotland
Community radio stations in the United Kingdom
Defunct radio stations in the United Kingdom
2004 establishments in Scotland
Mainland, Orkney